Paris, the capital of France, has an annual 30 million foreign visitors, and so is one of the most visited cities in the world. Paris' sights include monuments and architecture, such as its Arc de Triomphe, Eiffel Tower and neo-classic Haussmannian boulevards and buildings as well as museums, operas and concert halls. There are also more modern attractions such as its suburban Disneyland Paris. With its many monument, the city is a symbol of French culture, and since the 2000s attracts nearly three million visitors per year.

Within the City of Paris

Museums

 Centre Georges-Pompidou - 20th-century modern art museum, hosting the Paris Museum of Modern Art
 Cité des Sciences et de l'Industrie - a hands-on science museum that attracts over two million visitors yearly
 The Louvre - one of the world's largest museums and a historic monument
 Musée des Arts et Métiers - Museum of Arts and Crafts that houses the collection of the Conservatoire National des Arts et Métiers (National Conservatory of Arts and Industry), which was founded in 1794 as a repository for the preservation of scientific instruments and inventions
 Musée d'Orsay - 19th-century paintings, one of the largest Impressionist exhibits, housed in a former rail station
Musée de l'Orangerie - Impressionist and post-impressionist paintings, the permanent home of eight large Water Lilies murals by Claude Monet
Musée Marmottan Monet - dedicated to Claude Monet, includes over 300 paintings including Monet's Impression, Sunrise
 Muséum national d'histoire naturelle - National Museum of Natural History
 Musée Rodin - houses the works of sculptors Auguste Rodin and Camille Claudel
 Parc de la Villette - hosting the Cité des Sciences et de l'Industrie, a science museum, and the Cité de la Musique, which houses various musical institutes, a museum, and a concert hall

Monuments

 The Arc de Triomphe - monument at the center of the Place de l'Étoile, commemorating the victories of France and honoring those who died in battle
 The Conciergerie - located on the Île de la Cité; a medieval building which was formerly used as a prison where some prominent members of the ancien régime stayed before their death during the French Revolution
 The Eiffel Tower - a construction of Gustave Eiffel for the 1889 Universal Exposition
 The Grand Palais - a large glass exhibition hall built for the 1900 Paris Exhibition
 Les Invalides - complex containing museums and monuments relating to the military history of France
 The Palais Garnier - Paris's central opera house, built in the later Second Empire period
 The Panthéon - church and tomb of a number of France's most famed men and women
 Place des Vosges - square in the Marais districte
 Place Vendôme

Churches

 Basilica of the Sacré Cœur - located in the district of Montmartre
 The Montmartre Cemetery - located in the district of Montmartre
 Notre Dame de Paris Cathedral - Paris's 12th-century ecclesiastical centrepiece on the Île de la Cité
 The Père Lachaise Cemetery - a romantic cemetery.
 Sainte-Chapelle - a 13th-century Gothic palace chapel, also located on the Île de la Cité
 Church of St Eustache - a 16th-century Gothic church in the district of Les Halles
 La Madeleine - a 19th-century church designed as a Roman temple
 Grand Mosque of Paris - a large mosque, the first ever built in Metropolitan France

Modern and contemporary architecture of the 20th and 21st century 
 Arab World Institute (1987) Jean Nouvel, 5th arrondissement of Paris
 Bercy Arena, équipe Andrault-Parat, Jean Prouvé, Guvan (1984), 12th arrondissement of Paris. 
 Cité internationale universitaire de Paris, Pavillon Suisse (1930) and Maison du Brésil (1954), Le Corbusier and Lúcio Costa for the latter
 Front de Seine (1970s) and Centre commercial Beaugrenelle, Valode et Pistre (2013), 15th arrondissement of Paris
 Minister of the Economy, Finances and Industry (1989), 12th arrondissement of Paris. 
 Musée Mendjisky, Robert Mallet-Stevens, (1932) 15th arrondissement of Paris
 Opéra Bastille, Carlos Ott (1989), 11th arrondissement of Paris
 Palais de Chaillot (1937), Jacques Carlu, Louis-Hippolyte Boileau and Léon Azéma, 16th arrondissement of Paris
 Palais de la Porte Dorée (1931), Albert Laprade, 12th arrondissement of Paris
 Palais de Tokyo (1937), architects: Jean-Claude Dondel, André Aubert, Paul Viard et Marcel Dastugue, low reliefs: Alfred Janniot, statue La France: Antoine Bourdelle, 16th arrondissement of Paris
 Palais d'Iéna (1937), Auguste Perret, 16th arrondissement of Paris
 Palais de Chaillot (1937), Jacques Carlu, Louis-Hippolyte Boileau and Léon Azéma, 16th arrondissement of Paris (1927), Jacques Marcel Auburtin, André Granet and Jean-Baptiste Mathon, 8th arrondissement of Paris
 Salle Pleyel (1927), Jacques Marcel Auburtin, André Granet and Jean-Baptiste Mathon, 8th arrondissement of Paris
 La Samaritaine, building facing the river (1928?), Frantz Jourdain and Henri Sauvage, 1st arrondissement of Paris
 Site of the French communist party, Oscar Niemeyer (1965-1980), 19th arrondissement of Paris
 Théâtre des Champs-Élysées (1913), Auguste Perret, 8th arrondissement of Paris
 Tour Montparnasse, architects Jean Saubot, Eugène Beaudouin, Urbain Cassan and Louis de Hoÿm de Marien (1973), 15th arrondissement of Paris
 World Heritage Centre (Unesco) (1958) architects: French Bernard Zehrfuss, Américan Marcel Breuer, and Italian Pier Luigi Nervi. Their plans were validated by an international committee of five architects: Lucio Costa (Brasil), Walter Gropius (United States), Le Corbusier (France), Sven Markelius (Sweden) and Ernesto Nathan Rogers (Italy), in collaboration with Eero Saarinen (Finland). 7th arrondissement of Paris
 Centre national d'art et de culture Georges-Pompidou, Renzo Piano, Richard Rogers, Gianfranco Franchini (1977), 1st arrondissement of Paris
 Les Echelles du Baroque, Ricardo Bofill (1985), 14th arrondissement of Paris
 La Géode, architects Adrien Fainsilber and Gérard Chamayou (1985), 19th arrondissement of Paris
 Église Notre-Dame-de-l'Arche-d'Alliance, Architecture-Studio (1986), 15th arrondissement of Paris
 Louvre Pyramid, Ieoh Ming Pei (1989), 1st arrondissement of Paris
 La Défense, Paris business district, Grande Arche, Johan Otto von Spreckelsen and Erik Reitzel (1989) 
 Parc André-Citroën, landscaping: Gilles Clément, Allain Provost, architects Patrick Berger, Jean-François Jodry and Jean-Paul Viguier, (1992), 15th arrondissement of Paris 

 Canal+ former site (1992), Richard Meier, 15th arrondissement of Paris 
 Outside shell Ministère de la Culture (France), 1st arrondissement of Paris
 Cinémathèque française (1993), Frank Gehry, 12th arrondissement of Paris. 
 Fondation Cartier pour l'art contemporain, Jean Nouvel (1994), 14th arrondissement of Paris
 Bibliothèque nationale de France, Dominique Perrault (1995), 13th arrondissement of Paris
 Musée du quai Branly, Jean Nouvel (2006), 7th arrondissement of Paris
 Cité de la mode et du design, Jakob + Macfarlane (2008), 13th arrondissement of Paris
 Louis Vuitton Foundation, Frank Gehry (2014), 16th arrondissement of Paris
 Philharmonie de Paris, Jean Nouvel (2015), 19th arrondissement of Paris

Others
 Montmartre - an old district of Paris on a hill containing the Basilica of the Sacré Cœur, the Place du Tertre, the Musée de Montmartre, and other sites. 
 The Sorbonne - one of the universities of Paris (Paris IV), the centre of Paris's Latin Quarter.
 Statue of Liberty replicas - A smaller version of Frédéric Auguste Bartholdi's Liberty Enlightening the World, the New York City harbor statue which France gave to the United States in 1886, located on the Île aux Cygnes on the Seine in the Front de Seine district.
  Another smaller version is in the Luxembourg Garden.
 Flame of Liberty - replica of the flame held by the Statue of Liberty
 Pasteur Institute and museum

In the Paris region

Monuments
 Palace of Versailles - the famous former palace of French kings
 Saint Denis Basilica - the burial site of the French kings
 Château de Fontainebleau - built by Francis I of France, it is one of the largest of the French royal châteaux
 Château de Vaux-le-Vicomte
 Château de Vincennes (Vincennes Castle) - a large medieval castle nearby the Bois de Vincennes (Vincennes Wood)
 Château Villette - a château built in the 18th century
 Parc de Sceaux - a 17th-century park located near the Château de Sceaux (Sceaux Castle).
 La Défense - The largest business district in Europe.
 Cathédrale Saint-Maclou de Pontoise - Roman Catholic cathedral located in the town of Pontoise, on the outskirts of Paris.

Entertainment
 Disneyland Paris Resort - the largest theme park in Europe
 Parc Astérix - one of many of Paris' theme parks
 Stade de France - the 80,000 seater stadium in which France won the 1998 edition of the FIFA World Cup

See also

 Landmarks in Paris
 Historical quarters of Paris
 List of Domes in France
 List of museums in Paris
 List of tourist attractions worldwide

Notes and references 

 
Visitor attractions
Paris
PAris